Get Back is a song by American punk rock band Zebrahead from their second and major label debut album Waste of Mind which was released on 1998. When the song was released it became a minor hit on the radio and charted #32 on the US Modern Rock Tracks. It's the first and only song so far to be charted on a US Billboard chart from Zebrahead and also is the best known.

Music video
The music video features the band on the final floor of a building (presumably a hotel or apartment building) and then while performing the song they fall through the other floors of the building.

Track listing
US version
"Get Back" – 3:32
"Swing" – 2:50
"Check" – 2:26

Canadian version
"Get Back" – 3:32
"The Real Me" – 3:57
"Check" – 2:26

Australian version
"Get Back" – 3:32
"Hate" – 1:58
"Song 10" – 2:11

Chart positions

External links
Zebrahead discography (singles section not actualized since 2006)

1998 singles
Zebrahead songs
1998 songs
Song recordings produced by Howard Benson
Columbia Records singles